Mohammad Zakir Hossain is a former One Day International cricketer from Bangladesh. He played his only ODI against Pakistan on 12 January 1998. He was a first-class and List A cricketer from Bangladesh. He is a right-handed batsman and right arm medium fast bowler. He played two times in Bangladesh National Cricket League for Chittagong Division in 2000–01 and for Khulna Division in 2004–05.

References

External links

Bangladeshi cricketers
Chittagong Division cricketers
Khulna Division cricketers
Living people
1977 births
Cricketers from Dhaka